Hutchinson Island is an ice-covered island  long, lying  east of Vollmer Island in the Marshall Archipelago. It was mapped by the United States Geological Survey from surveys and U.S. Navy air photos (1959–65), and named by Advisory Committee on Antarctic Names for Lieutenant Peter A. Hutchinson, U.S. Navy, operations officer aboard  along this coast, 1961–62.

See also 
 List of Antarctic and sub-Antarctic islands

References

Islands of Marie Byrd Land